Willy Maertens (1893–1967) was a German film and television actor. He was married to the actress Charlotte Kramm with whom he had a son Peter Maertens.

Selected filmography

 Attack on Baku (1942) - Notar beim dänischen Ölherrn Jenssen
 In Those Days (1947) - Wilhelm Bienert / 3. Geschichte
 Nora's Ark (1948) - Willi Lüdecke
 The Original Sin (1948) 
 Unknown Sender (1950) - Herr Lehmann - Magdas Vater
 Only One Night (1950)
  (1950) - Dr. Bing
 You Have to be Beautiful (1951) - Arzt
 Engel im Abendkleid (1951)
 Under the Thousand Lanterns (1952) - Mahnke, Gerichtsvollzieher
 Toxi (1952) - Kriminal-Inspektor Plaukart
 Oh, You Dear Fridolin (1952) - Dr. Mond, Verleger
 I'm Waiting for You (1952) - Hausmeister Wagner
 Not Afraid of Big Animals (1953) - Lawyer Immelmann
 It Was Always So Nice With You (1954) - Hannemann - Elisabeths Vater
 Consul Strotthoff (1954)
 Geständnis unter vier Augen (1954)
 Three from Variety (1954)
 Music, Music and Only Music (1955)
 Wie werde ich Filmstar? (1955)
 Die Ehe des Dr. med. Danwitz (1956) - Ein Verunglückter
 Mädchen mit schwachem Gedächtnis (1956) - Herr Prechtl
 The Captain from Köpenick (1956) - Prokurist Knell
  (1956) - Alter Bauer
 If We All Were Angels (1956)
 At the Green Cockatoo by Night (1957) - Onkel Otto, ihr Mann
 Der Mann, der nicht nein sagen konnte (1958)
 That Won't Keep a Sailor Down (1958)
  (1959) - Dr. Kühne
 Of Course, the Motorists (1959) - Film-Regisseur
  (1959) - Count Schleizenstein (uncredited)
 Darkness Fell on Gotenhafen (1960) - Vater Reiser
 The Miracle of Father Malachia (1961)
 The Liar (1961)

References

Bibliography
 Shandley, Robert. Rubble Films: German Cinema in the Shadow of the Third Reich. Temple University Press, 2001.

External links

1893 births
1967 deaths
German male film actors
German male television actors
Actors from Braunschweig